Waikato Diocesan School for Girls is a state-integrated single-sex girls' secondary school in Hamilton, New Zealand. It is an Anglican girls' Boarding school for students from Year 9 to Year 13. It also has day students.

History 
Dio was first established as Sonning School in 1909, situated on Milton Street, Hamilton.
With only a small roll of four pupils the school began to grow, and as it did there was need for larger premises so it was moved to Anglesea Street.
Larger land was then purchased and a new school built on the eastern side of the railway bridge.
This school was named Sonning after the Berkshire Village from which the Whitehorn family originated.
It was then that the first Bishop of the Waikato, Cecil Cherrington, wanted to establish an Anglican Girls School in Hamilton and the Waikato Board for Diocesan Schools, formed in 1927, leased Sonning School from Mrs Whitehorn and then, in 1929. Property at the current site in River Road, Hamilton, New Zealand was then bought.
Waikato Diocesan School was officially opened in 1928 with a roll of 13 boarders and 70 day girls. The school opened at its permanent site in 1930, consisting of its flagship building, Cherrington, the Homestead, a barn, which was used as both hall and chapel, and open air classrooms.
Dio has continued to grow and has had 11 principals, and now has a roll of around 620 students.

Waikato Diocesan School was a private school until March 1983, when it integrated into the state education system.

Houses

Notable alumnae
Dame Ann Ballin (1932–2003), psychologist and victims' rights advocate
Kylie Bax (born 1975), model and actress
Susan O'Regan, mayor of Waipa
Hannah Osborne (born 1994), Olympic rower
Julia Ratcliffe (born 1993), track and field athlete
Dame Te Atairangikaahu (1931–2006), Māori queen
Nanaia Mahuta (born 1970), politician and 28th Minister of Foreign Affairs

References 

 Waikato Diocesan School. (2009). www.waikatodiocesan.school.nz. In Waikato Diocesan School for Girls. Retrieved 20 March 2009, from http://www.waikatodiocesan.school.nz/.
 McLennan, V. (2009) Waikato Diocesan School for Girls Prospectus. Hamilton, NZ: WDSG.

Secondary schools in Hamilton, New Zealand
Anglican schools in New Zealand
Girls' schools in New Zealand
Alliance of Girls' Schools Australasia